Žilys is a Lithuanian surname. Notable people with the surname include:
, graphic artist, recipient of the 2015 Lithuanian National Prize for Culture and Arts
 (born 1942), lawyer, judge of the Constitutional Court of Lithuania
Vincas Žilys (1898–1972), Lithuanian general

Lithuanian-language surnames